Glenn T. Harrell Jr. (born 1945) is an American lawyer and jurist from Upper Marlboro, Maryland. From 1999 to 2015, he served as a judge on the Maryland Court of Appeals, the highest court in the state.

Harrell attended the University of Maryland, earning a B.A. in 1967 and a J.D. in 1970 from the University of Maryland School of Law. He was admitted to the Maryland bar in 1970 and entered private practice. He was first made a judge in the Court of Special Appeals in 1991 and elevated to the highest court on September 10, 1999.

References

External links
Court of Appeals: Glenn T. Harrell, Jr.

1945 births
Living people
Judges of the Maryland Court of Appeals
University of Maryland, College Park alumni
University of Maryland Francis King Carey School of Law alumni